The 2015 Commonwealth Weightlifting Championships were held at the Shree Shiv Chhatrapati Sports Complex in Pune, India from 12 to 16 October 2015.

Medal summary
The following stats relate to senior results only. Junior and youth results are cited here and here respectively.

Medal table

Men

Women

Medal reallocations

References

External links
Senior results book
Junior results book
Youth results book

Weightlifting competitions
Weightlifting
Commonwealth Weightlifting Championships
Commonwealth Weightlifting Championships
Commonwealth Weightlifting Championships
International sports competitions hosted by India
Weightlifting in India
Commonwealth Weightlifting Championships